The Nio EC6 is a battery-powered mid-size luxury crossover SUV manufactured by Chinese electric car company Nio. It was announced in 2019 and has been on sale since 2020.

Overview 

The EC6 is a 5-door, 5-seater crossover SUV with a sporting roofline. It is a "crossover coupe" counterpart to the more boxy ES6. The car is offered with an option for a 100-kWh battery, available for all current Nio models. The EC6 is powered by a lithium-ion battery pack, which is swappable, just like the Nio ES8.

Since February 2020, the manufacturer has sold the EC6 in mainland China.

Specifications 
The entry version generates , translating into a 0–100 km/h time of 5.4 seconds. This version uses permanent magnet motors in both the front and the rear.

The high-end version generates , translating into a 0–100 km/h time of 4.5 seconds. This version uses a 160kW permanent magnet motor in the front and a 240kW induction motor in the rear.

The EC6 is available with two lithium-ion battery pack options: 70 kWh or 100 kWh. The latter offers a range of 615km NEDC. 

Nio claims that the car comes with the largest panoramic sunroof "in its class". The car features active air suspension, NOMI AI personal assistant, Nappa leather and intelligent fragrance system.

References 

EC6
Electric concept cars
Luxury crossover sport utility vehicles
Production electric cars
Cars introduced in 2020